St Luke's Church, Kew, is a parish church in Kew, in the London Borough of Richmond upon Thames. It is part of the Church of England and the Anglican Communion and, locally, is a member of Churches Together in Kew. Together with St Philip and All Saints (the Barn Church), it is one of two parishes within the united benefice of Kew, St Philip & All Saints with St Luke. Its vicar, Rev Dr Melanie Harrington,  took up the role in June 2021. The church, built in the Gothic Revival style by architects Goldie, Child and Goldie, is also host to the Kew Community Trust and acts as a community centre.

Communications

The parish publishes a magazine, The Link.

History
Kew's population increased considerably when the District line was extended to Richmond and a railway station was opened at Kew Gardens. To meet the needs of the extended parish, a temporary "iron church" (later Victoria & St John's Working Men's Club) was opened in Sandycombe Road.  St Luke's Church, in The Avenue, was built to replace it, in 1889.

The large Victorian church, whose initial design plans included a spire that was never built, now has a small tower (accommodating a lift). This was added in 1983 when St Luke's was redesigned to create a smaller space for Christian worship in the former chancel area and to enable the former nave, and a second hall constructed in a loft conversion, to be used for community purposes also.

Former Liberal Party chairman Timothy Beaumont, Baron Beaumont of Whitley, was priest in charge from 1986 to 1991.

Other uses

The community spaces in the building are currently occupied by the Kew Community Trust. The core activity of the Trust is the Avenue Club,  a non-profit making  social centre offering a range of recreational activities for the whole community.

Gallery

See also
 The Barn Church, Kew
 St Anne's Church, Kew
 Victoria Working Men's Club

References

External links
  Official website
 Kew Community Trust

1889 establishments in England
19th-century Church of England church buildings
Kew
Kew
Churches completed in 1889
Churches in Kew
Community centres in London
Gothic Revival church buildings in London
Social centres in the United Kingdom